The 2016–17 Washington Huskies men's basketball team represented the University of Washington in the 2016–17 NCAA Division I men's basketball season. Members of the Pac-12 Conference, the Huskies were led by fifteenth-year head coach Lorenzo Romar and played their home games on campus at Alaska Airlines Arena at Hec Edmundson Pavilion in Seattle, Washington.

The Huskies finished the season 9–22, 2–16 in Pac-12 play, in eleventh place. In the Pac-12 tournament, they lost in the first round to sixth-seeded USC. Romar was fired on March 15; four days later, he was succeeded by Mike Hopkins, a longtime assistant at Syracuse under

Previous season
The Huskies finished the 2015–16 season 19–15, 9–9 in Pac-12 play to finish in a three-way for sixth place. The Huskies defeated Stanford in the first round of the Pac-12 tournament before losing to Oregon in the quarterfinals. They received an invitation to the National Invitation Tournament as No. 3 seed. There they defeated Long Beach State in the first round before losing to San Diego State in the second round.

Off-season

Departures

2016 recruiting class

Roster

Depth chart

Source

Coaching staff

Schedule and results

|-
!colspan=12 style=| Exhibition

|-
!colspan=12 style=| Non-conference regular season

|-
!colspan=12 style=| Pac-12 regular season

|-
!colspan=12 style=| Pac-12 Tournament

References

Washington Huskies men's basketball seasons
Washington
Washington
Washington
Washington